Hegemann is a German surname. Notable people with the surname include:

 Dimitri Hegemann, German nightclub owner and activist 
 Elizabeth Compton Hegemann (1897–1962), American photographer
 Helene Hegemann (born 1992), German writer, director, and actor
 Marta Hegemann (1894–1970), German artist
 Peter Hegemann (born 1954), German biophysicist
 Werner Hegemann (1881–1936), city planner and architecture critic

German-language surnames